Barterode is an urban subdivision in Adelebsen municipality in the south of Lower Saxony, situated about 12 km to the west of Göttingen.

Places of interest

 Fire engine house (Spritzenhaus) Barterode:

External links 

www.barterode.de, Website of the Home Association Barterode

Former municipalities in Lower Saxony
Göttingen (district)